This is a list of known American football players who have played for the Buffalo Rangers of the National Football League in 1926. It includes players that have played at least one match with the team.



A
Neely Allison

B
Wes Bradshaw

C
Les Caywood

D
Don Dimmick

E
Van Edmondson

F
Lou Feist

G
Roy Guffey

H
Ben Hobson

I
Barlow Irvin

K
Tex Kelly, 
Jim Kendrick,
George Kirk

M
Firpo McGilbra

N
Ralph Nairan,
George Nix

P
Ralph Pittman, 
Roger Powell

S
Ted Schwarzer, 
Elmer Slough, 
Al Swain

V
Bill Vaughn

W
Cop Weathers,
Firpo Wilcox, 
Joe Wilson,
Mule Wilson

References
Buffalo Rangers roster

Lists
 
Buffalo R